Murray Roman (March 8, 1929 – November 6, 1973) was an American stand-up comedian, whose career was cut short by a car crash.  Many consider his style, and material, to be similar to Lenny Bruce. Roman was also a writer on The Smothers Brothers Comedy Hour and, as part of the Comedy Hour writing team, won an Emmy for his work in 1969. His most noted sketch was "The Honey House," which mocked the 1968 hit song "Honey," by Bobby Goldsboro. The skit featured a tour of house where the eponymous Honey had lived and died, conducted by her husband, played first by Tom Smothers and then by Dick.

Biography
According to Bob Einstein, Keith Moon was a "huge fan" of Roman. Moon helped Roman obtain a contract with Track Records.

Roman married three times and had three daughters.

Discography
 Out of Control
 You Can't Beat People Up And Have Them Say I Love You
 A Blind Man's Movie
 Busted
 Backtrack 13 (You Can't Beat People Up And Have Them Say I Love You)

TV appearances
The Rat Patrol, "The Tug-of-War Raid": (March 4, 1968) As Lt. Pohl
The Monkees, "Fairytale" (January 8, 1968) as Harold
That Girl, "This Little Piggy Had a Ball" (March 23, 1967) As Manager of Bowling Alley
ABC Stage 67, "On The Flip Side" (December 7, 1966) As Hairy Eddie Popkin
Batman, "Hizzonner the Penguin (1)" (November 2, 1966) and "Dizzonner the Penguin (2)" (November 3, 1966) as E.G. Trends 
The Smothers Brothers Comedy Hour, wrote and occasionally appeared.

Influence
DJ Shadow sampled Roman's record Busted in "Stem/Long Stem/Transmission 2", a track on his 1996 album Endtroducing. DJ Shadow also sampled Busted on his single "Lost and Found (S.F.L.)".

References

External links
The Forgotten Murray Roman @ WFMU

20th-century American comedians
Emmy Award winners
Road incident deaths in California
1973 deaths
1929 births